Kill Uncle is the second solo studio album by English alternative rock singer Morrissey, released on 4 March 1991 by EMI Records and HMV Records. The title comes from the color black comedy film Let's Kill Uncle (1966).

Recording
Kill Uncle was recorded during a transitional phase for Morrissey, having parted ways with record producer Stephen Street but not yet working with his future long-term team of guitarists Alain Whyte and Boz Boorer. The album was produced by Clive Langer and Alan Winstanley with most of the music written by Fairground Attraction's Mark E. Nevin.

Content
The opening track, "Our Frank", describes "frank and open, deep conversations" that get the singer nowhere and leave him disheartened. The final verse, however, sees Morrissey singing "Won't somebody stop me from thinking? From thinking all the time. So deeply, so bleakly ...", which critic David Thompson interprets as indicating that the conversations he so dreads are in fact with himself.

"Asian Rut" tells of the murder of an Asian boy by three English boys, in which Morrissey's vocals are backed only by strings, bass, and sound effects. The song continues the trope of Morrissey writing about English racism from a unique angle, as with "Bengali in Platforms" on Viva Hate (1988).

"Sing Your Life" has Morrissey encouraging the listener to express themselves, as he sings, "Walk right up to the microphone and name all the things you love, all the things you loathe." A rockabilly version of the song also exists, recorded live at KROQ-FM in Los Angeles after Morrissey started working with new guitarists Boz Boorer and Alain Whyte.

"Mute Witness" tells of an attempt to get information out of a shocked witness who cannot speak at a trial, featuring piano backing composed by Clive Langer. "King Leer" follows, a relaxed tune with sardonic lyrical puns. "Found Found Found", another Langer track, is the only heavy song on the album. Morrissey sings that he's found "someone who's worth it in this murkiness" but ends complaining this person is "somebody who wants to be with me... all the time".

"Driving Your Girlfriend Home" is a ballad in which Morrissey tells of driving home the girlfriend of an unspecified person. He reveals she asks him, "'How did I end up so deeply involved in the very existence I planned on avoiding?'" and that "She's laughing to stop herself crying." These outpourings are interspersed with directional instructions. Morrissey tells us "I can't tell her" the answer to her question and that the ride concludes with them "shaking hands goodnight so politely."

The next track, "The Harsh Truth of the Camera Eye", is often cited as Morrissey's most misunderstood song. The lyric is describing the "pain because of the strain of smiling" and the dichotomy between one's public image and private personality. The music consists of a carnival-like synthesizer and also features sound effects like a door slamming and a camera shutter snapping, along with piano accompaniment.

In "(I'm) The End of the Family Line", the singer rues he will never have children, an insult into the "fifteen generations... of mine" that produced him. The lyric is complemented by a subdued guitar backing, and ends with a similar 'false' fadeout similar to such Smiths songs as "That Joke Isn't Funny Anymore".

The original album closes with "There Is a Place in Hell for Me and My Friends", a simple piano piece that reflects the existential longing of the album and showcases Morrissey's torch song influence. This version was replaced in the 2013 expanded edition by the recording from the At KROQ live EP.

The 2013 expanded edition of the album added the songs "East West" and "Pashernate Love", as well as changing the running order of some tracks.

Release
Kill Uncle was released on 4 March 1991 by record labels EMI and HMV.

"Our Frank", the album's lead single and opening track, reached No. 26 in the UK Singles Chart and No. 2 in the US Modern Rock Tracks chart. "Sing Your Life" was also released as a single, reaching No. 33 in the UK and No. 10 on the US Modern Rock Tracks chart.

On 5 February 2013, Morrissey announced the reissue of the album along with a remastered version of his 1989 single "The Last of the Famous International Playboys", both to be released 8 April 2013. This was as part of a Morrissey reissue campaign by Parlophone. This version of the album includes three additional tracks and is available as a gatefold CD and heavyweight gatefold LP. The picture disc single and album feature new cover artworks. The press release mentioned that "the album has a revitalised quality, which accentuates some of its more subtle, experimental qualities and nuances; in particular, some of the more unusual musical styles which Morrissey explored for the first time".

Critical reception

Kill Uncle has generally divided opinion amongst music critics.

In a retrospective review, Stephen Thomas Erlewine of AllMusic panned the album, describing it as "Morrissey's least distinguished record" with "neither melody nor much wit". Mark Hogan of Pitchfork wrote that the album "is best appreciated as a campy celebration of the decorative and artificial." Mat Snow in Q Magazine described it as "further evidence of woodworm in the creative rafters" and highlighted the short running time of the album.

Track listing

Personnel
Credits are adapted from the Kill Uncle liner notes.

Musicians
 Morrissey – vocals
 Mark E. Nevin – guitar
 Mark Bedford – bass guitar
 Andrew Paresi – drums; percussion
 Seamus Beaghen – keyboards
 Steven Heart – keyboards
 Nawazish Ali Khan – violin
 Linder Sterling – backing vocals

Production and artwork
 Alan Winstanley – production
 Clive Langer – production
 Simon Metcalfe – engineering assistance
 Gino Sprio – sleeve photography
 Jo Slee – sleeve art coordinator

Charts

Certifications

References

External links
 

Morrissey albums
1991 albums
Albums produced by Alan Winstanley
Albums produced by Clive Langer
Sire Records albums
Glam rock albums by English artists